Sir Steven Murray Smith, FAcSS, FRSA (born 4 February 1952) is an English international relations theorist and long serving university leader. He is the former Vice Chancellor of the University of Exeter and Professor of International Studies.

Early life
Smith was born on 4 February 1952 in Norwich, England. He attended the City of Norwich School, then a grammar school, on Eaton Road, Norwich. His parents were from working class backgrounds. At a parents' evening, his form master told his parents about their son that "people like you don't go to university". The school afterwards suggested finding a low-skilled job for him.

Smith gained a Bachelor of Science (BSc) in Politics and International Studies in 1973, a Master of Science (MSc) degree in international studies in 1974 and a Doctor of Philosophy degree (PhD) in international relations in 1978, all from the University of Southampton.

Academic career
From 1976 to 1978, Smith lectured at Huddersfield Polytechnic. From 1979 to 1992, he lectured at University of East Anglia, becoming director of the Centre for Public Choice Studies at UEA. He was a professor at the university from 1990 to 1992. From 1992 to 2002, he was senior pro vice-chancellor (academic affairs), as well as professor of international politics at University of Wales, Aberystwyth and head of the Department of International Politics.

In October 2002, he succeeded Geoffrey Holland as vice-chancellor of the University of Exeter. 
When, under his vice-chancellorship Edzard Ernst was involved in a dispute with Prince Charles about the Smallwood Report into complementary medicine, the prince's secretary Sir Michael Peat put pressure on the University to discipline Ernst for publicizing his reasons for dissociating himself from the report. After being subjected to a "very unpleasant" investigation by the University of Exeter, in which Ernst was "treated as guilty until proven innocent", the university accepted his innocence but continued, in his view, to treat him as "persona non grata". All fundraising for his unit ceased, forcing him to use up its core funding, allowing its 15 staff to drift away, and leading to his early retirement.

In the period 2003 to 2004, he was president of the International Studies Association (ISA), only the second non-American to receive this honour. Between 2006 and 2008 he was Chair of the Board of the 1994 Group. From August 2009 to August 2011, he was the President of Universities UK and remains on the board.

In 2012, Sir Steve Smith, together with the vice-chancellor of Plymouth University announced the demerger of Peninsula College of Medicine and Dentistry, and the establishment of the University of Exeter Medical School and the Plymouth University "Peninsula" Schools of Medicine and Dentistry. He is a member of the Board of Governors of the S. Rajaratnam School of International Studies in Singapore.

Publications
During his academic career, Smith has written or edited thirteen books and almost 100 academic papers. He has given over 150 academic presentations in 22 different countries. Within international relations theory, he often writes in a post-positivist vein, and has contributed articles to edited volumes on both post-modernism in international relations and Critical Security Studies. He co-authored Explaining and Understanding International Relations with the late Professor Martin Hollis.

He was the editor of the joint Cambridge University Press and British International Studies Association, Cambridge Studies in International Relations.

Honours and awards
Smith was the recipient of 1999 Susan Strange Award, awarded by the International Studies Association. In 2000, he was elected as an Academician of the Social Sciences (AcSS). In April 2007, he was awarded an honorary professorship by Jilin University in China. In 2009, he was elected a Fellow of the Royal Society of Arts. He was knighted in the 2011 Queen's Birthday Honours "for services to local and national Higher Education".

He was recognized by University of South Florida President Judy Genshaft with the President's Global Leadership Award during spring commencement exercises 4–5 May 2012 on the Tampa campus. He was awarded a D.Litt by the Chinese University of Hong Kong in December 2020.

In October 2022 the University of Exeter named its Living Systems Institute in honour of its former Vice-Chancellor. His portrait (by Alastair Adams, 2022) hangs in Sir Steve Smith building.

Bibliography
Foreign Policy Adaptation, (Gower, 1981).
Politics and Human Nature, co-edited with Ian Forbes, (Pinter, 1983).
International Relations:  British and American Approaches, (Blackwell, 1985).
The Cold War Past and Present, co-edited with Richard Crockatt, (Allen and Unwin, 1987).
Belief Systems and International Relations, co-edited with Richard Little, (Blackwell, 1988).
British Foreign Policy: Tradition, Change, and Transformation, co-edited with Michael Smith and Brian White, (Unwin Hyman, 1988).
Explaining and Understanding International Relations, with Martin Hollis, (Clarendon Press, 1990).
Deciding Factors in British Politics, co-edited with John Greenaway and John Street, (Routledge, 1991).
European Foreign Policy: The European Community and Changing Perspectives in Europe, co-edited with Walter Carlsnaes, (Sage, 1994).
International Relations Theory Today, co-edited with Ken Booth, (Polity Press, 1995).
International Theory: Positivism and Beyond, co-edited with Ken Booth and Marysia Zalewski, (Cambridge University Press, 1996).
The Globalization of World Politics,  co-edited with John Baylis and Patricia Owens (Oxford University Press, Eighth edition 2019).
’’Foreign Policy: Theories, Actors, Cases’’, co-edited with Tim Dunne and Amelia Hatfield (Oxford University Press, Third edition, 2016).
’’International Relations Theories: Discipline and Diversity’’, co-edited with Tim Dunne and Milja Kurki (Oxford University Press, Fifth edition, 2021).
’’Introduction to Global Politics’’, with Steve Lamy, John Baylis and Patricia Owens (Oxford University Press, Sixth edition, 2020).

References

External links
 University of Exeter

1952 births
Living people
People from Norwich
British political scientists
Fellows of the Academy of Social Sciences
Academics of the University of Exeter
Academics of the University of East Anglia
Academics of Aberystwyth University
Alumni of the University of Southampton
Vice-Chancellors of the University of Exeter
People educated at the City of Norwich School
Place of birth missing (living people)
Knights Bachelor